In mathematics, a function  is said to be closed if for each , the sublevel set

is a closed set.

Equivalently, if the epigraph defined by

is closed, then the function  is closed.

This definition is valid for any function, but most used for convex functions.  A proper convex function is closed if and only if it is lower semi-continuous.  For a convex function which is not proper there is disagreement as to the definition of the closure of the function.

Properties

 A closed proper convex function f is the pointwise supremum of the collection of all affine functions h such that h ≤ f (called the affine minorants of f).

References

 

Convex analysis
Types of functions